The 2022 Wokingham Borough Council election took place as of Thursday 5 May 2022. That was the same day as other United Kingdom local elections in order to elect members of Wokingham Unitary Council in Berkshire, England. One third of the council, 18 seats, was up for election and the Conservative Party lost control of the council, but was the largest group.

The composition of the council before the election was as follows:

After the election, the composition of the council became:

Wokingham Borough Council is No Overall Control

Background
A total of 64 candidates contested the 18 seats which were up for election. After the election, Wokingham Borough Council became No Overall Control.

After this election, the Wokingham Borough Partnership was formed from the 23 Liberal Democrat Councillors, 3 Labour Councillors and the 2 Independent Councillors. Together, they formed a majority and collectively agreed to work together in the best interests of the residents.

Election result

These are the results as of 6 May 2022

There were a total of 42,711 votes cast, including 192 spoiled ballots.

Ward results

Council Membership by party after each election 2010–2022

References

Wokingham
Wokingham Borough Council elections
2020s in Berkshire